John Taylor Bell Foundry (Loughborough) Limited, trading as John Taylor & Co and commonly known as Taylor's Bell Foundry, Taylor's of Loughborough, or simply Taylor's, is the world's largest working bell foundry. It is located in Loughborough, in the Charnwood borough of Leicestershire, England. The business originated in the 14th century, and the Taylor family took over in 1784.

The company manufactures bells for use in clock towers, rings of bells for change ringing, chimes, and carillons. In 2005, Taylor's merged with Eayre & Smith Limited (bellhangers) and from 2005 until 2009 was known as Taylors Eayre & Smith Limited.

In September 2009, Taylor's went into administration but was bought out of administration by a consortium named UK Bell Foundries Ltd, led by Andrew Wilby, which re-financed the business. Since then, the company has re-established its presence both in the UK and in export markets.

The foundry has a museum of bells and bellfounding, which is the only one of its kind in the UK. It is one of the few Victorian purpose-built manufacturing sites still being used for its original purpose. Its campanile contains the most-pealed bells in the world.

History

The present company is part of a line of bellfounders dating back to Johannes de Stafford in the 14th century, who was also a mayor of Leicester. The Taylor family became involved in 1784 with Robert Taylor (1759–1830), and a foundry was established in Loughborough in 1839 by his son John Taylor (1797–1858), moving to the current site in 1859. The Taylors also had foundries in Oxford and St Neots between 1786 and 1854.

During much of the later 19th century, the foundry was under the management of John William Taylor (1827–1906). Taylor's was the first bellfounder to adopt "true-harmonic" tuning in the late 19th century. In 1963, Paul Taylor, last of the Taylor family in the business, appeared on the American TV panel show What's My Line?, challenging the panel with his occupation as a bell maker.

The foundry is based in buildings on Freehold Street, which are Grade II* listed. The National Twelve Bell Contest is competed for annually by the leading teams in England for "The Taylor Trophy".

On 18 September 2009, the company went into administration. Mazars, which had previously been acting as advisors to the company during attempts to secure extra funding, were appointed administrators. On 2 October 2009, it was reported that the administrators were "optimistic about its future." On 15 October 2009, in a statement released by UK Bell Foundries Ltd, a consortium of ringers, members of the bell industry and other investors, it was stated that the foundry would reopen on 19 October, reverting to the previous name of John Taylor & Co. Paul Taylor's widow, Mrs Merle Taylor, was honorary president of the new company until her death.

The board from 2015 to 2020 comprised Andrew W R Wilby (chairman and CEO), Laith R Reynolds, David E Potter, Michael J Semken, Simon E Adams, D Paul Mason and Andrew B Mills. In 2016, the directors of UK Bell Foundries Ltd founded the Loughborough Bellfoundry Trust and transferred ownership of the buildings, equipment, intellectual property and the museum to that body in perpetuity to safeguard it for the future. The Trust received emergency grants to restore several parts of the building from Historic England, as it was listed as a Grade II* building at risk. Further restoration was planned.

In 2018, the company established a subsidiary called John Taylor International, based in Australia, to serve the southern hemisphere markets. At the end of 2020, Andrew Wilby resigned as director and CEO; David Potter also resigned as director. Andrew's son Michael Wilby was managing director from October 2019 to August 2021.

Notable bells and rings 
In 1881 at Loughborough, Taylor's cast "Great Paul" (the largest British cast bell in Britain) for St Paul's Cathedral in London, weighing  or more than 17 metric tons. Rock band AC/DC used a 2000-pound cast bronze bell for the song "Hells Bells", which was originally used on the Back in Black Tour in 1980.

Many churches around the world have used bells cast at Taylor's bell foundry, including:

References

Further reading

External links

 
 Panorama of the foundry – BBC Leicester
 History of the Taylor family
 Index of carillons, chimes and great bells produced by the Taylor foundry

1784 establishments in England
Bell foundries of the United Kingdom
British companies established in 1784
Carillon makers
Companies based in Loughborough
Museums in Leicestershire
Musical instrument museums in England
Taylor Bellfounders